Wiktor Olecki (9 September 1909 – 1981) was a Polish cyclist. He competed in the individual and team road race events at the 1936 Summer Olympics.

References

External links
 

1909 births
1981 deaths
Polish male cyclists
Olympic cyclists of Poland
Cyclists at the 1936 Summer Olympics
Cyclists from Warsaw
20th-century Polish people